Borg El Arab is a city located in Alexandria Governorate.

Borg El Arab may also refer to:

 New Borg El Arab, is a new Egyptian city of the first generation, located in Alexandria Governorate
 Borg El Arab Markaz, is an Egyptian municipal in Alexandria Governorate.
 Borg El Arab International Airport, is the international airport of Alexandria, Egypt
 Borg El Arab Stadium, is a stadium commissioned in 2005 west of Alexandria, Egypt
 Borg El Arab Technological University, is a national, non-profit Egyptian university.
 Burj al-Arab, Syria, is a village in northwestern Syria
 Borg El Arab, Lebanon, is a village in Akkar District, Lebanon
 Burj Al Arab, is a luxury hotel located in the city of Dubai, United Arab Emirates